Olean is an unincorporated community in Colfax County, Nebraska, United States.

History
A post office was established at Olean in 1873, and remained in operation until it was discontinued in 1877.

References

Unincorporated communities in Colfax County, Nebraska
Unincorporated communities in Nebraska